M. japonicus may refer to:
 Mallotus japonicus, a plant species found in Japan
 Marsupenaeus japonicus, the kuruma shrimp or kuruma prawn, a crustacean species
 Metanephrops japonicus, a lobster species found in Japanese waters

See also